Aladikaruppur is a village in the Kudavasal taluk of Tiruvarur district, Tamil Nadu, India.

Demographics 

As per the 2001 census, Aladikaruppur  had a total population of 1290 with 647 males and 643 females. The sex ratio was 994. The literacy rate was 62.15.

References 

 

Villages in Tiruvarur district